Lyria michardi is a species of sea snail, a marine gastropod mollusk in the family Volutidae, the volutes.

Description
The length of the shell attains 52.5 mm.

Distribution
This marine species occurs off Southern Madagascar.

References

 Bail P. (2009). A new species of Lyria (Gastropoda) from the southwestern coast of Madagascar. Novapex 10(2): 65-67

External links

Volutidae
Gastropods described in 2009